Naya Patrika National Daily is a daily newspaper published in Nepal, founded in 2007. It is Nepali language broadsheet newspaper with a daily print run of 270,000 copies. It is the first daily Nepalese print media to publish 7 different province-wise editions. The newspapers are printed and distributed from Kohalpur, Butwal, Kathmandu and Biratnagar.

References

External links

Daily newspapers published in Nepal
2007 establishments in Nepal